Jarrod Berry (born 5 February 1998) is a professional Australian rules footballer playing for the Brisbane Lions in the Australian Football League (AFL). He was drafted by Brisbane with their second selection and seventeenth overall in the 2016 national draft. He made his debut in the thirty-one point loss against  at Etihad Stadium in round three of the 2017 season.

Junior career
Berry was born and raised in Horsham, Victoria along with his younger brother, Tom Berry, who is also Jarrod's teammate at the Brisbane Lions. Jarrod was a standout junior, playing local football with the Horsham Saints and with the North Ballarat Rebels in the then, TAC cup. He was a standout bottom age player in the TAC cup, winning All-Australian and team of the year honours in 2015. He was highly touted as a possible number 1 draft pick for the 2016 season, although injuries and inconsistent form hampered his top age year. He captained Vic Country at the AFL Under 18 Championships in 2016, and he further improved his draft stock at the draft combine, winning both the 3 km time trial and the beep test, showing his competitiveness and endurance. He was eventually selected at pick 17 in the 2016 AFL draft alongside his best mate, Hugh McCluggage.

Statistics
Updated to the end of the 2022 season.

|-
| 2017 ||  || 13
| 16 || 7 || 3 || 92 || 127 || 219 || 56 || 61 || 0.4 || 0.2 || 5.8 || 7.9 || 13.7 || 3.5 || 3.8 || 0
|-
| 2018 ||  || 13
| 21 || 12 || 5 || 175 || 213 || 388 || 83 || 100 || 0.6 || 0.2 || 8.3 || 10.1 || 18.5 || 4.0 || 4.8 || 1
|-
| 2019 ||  || 7
| 20 || 8 || 10 || 211 || 181 || 392 || 89 || 76 || 0.4 || 0.5 || 10.6 || 9.1 || 19.6 || 4.5 || 3.8 || 1
|-
| 2020 ||  || 7
| 17 || 7 || 10 || 155 || 116 || 271 || 70 || 64 || 0.4 || 0.6 || 9.1 || 6.8 || 15.9 || 4.1 || 3.8 || 8
|-
| 2021 ||  || 7
| 11 || 5 || 2 || 75 || 63 || 138 || 24 || 34 || 0.5 || 0.2 || 6.8 || 5.7 || 12.5 || 2.2 || 3.1 || 0
|-
| 2022 ||  || 7
| 23 || 9 || 7 || 245 || 167 || 412 || 106 || 81 || 0.4 || 0.3 || 10.7 || 7.3 || 17.9 || 4.6 || 3.5 || 2
|- class=sortbottom
! colspan=3 | Career
! 108 !! 48 !! 37 !! 953 !! 867 !! 1820 !! 428 !! 416 !! 0.4 !! 0.3 !! 8.8 !! 8.0 !! 16.9 !! 4.0 !! 3.9 !! 12
|}

Notes

References

External links

1998 births
Living people
Brisbane Lions players
Greater Western Victoria Rebels players
Australian rules footballers from Victoria (Australia)